Avitek is a Russian defense company based in the city of Kirov. It manufactures guided anti-aircraft missiles, aircraft armaments and subsystems. It also manufactures ejection seats.

Avitek produces the 9M334 anti-aircraft missile modules for the Tor missile system, the K-36 and K-Z6D-3.5 catapults, missiles, lifting devices for aircraft, and armament suspension for helicopters.

Avitek was established in 1931 as the Moscow Aviation Plant No. 32. It was evacuated to Vyatka (now known as Kirov) during World War II. Since 2002 it is part of the Almaz-Antey holding.

References

External links
 

Companies based in Kirov Oblast
Almaz-Antey
Manufacturing companies established in 1931
1931 establishments in the Soviet Union
Defence companies of the Soviet Union
Aircraft component manufacturers of the Soviet Union